Scopula lechrioloma is a moth of the family Geometridae. It was described by Turner in 1908. It is found in Queensland, Australia.

References

Moths described in 1908
lechrioloma
Moths of Australia